The Jam of the Year World Tour was a concert tour which took place from January 1997 to January 1998 visiting cities all across the United States and Canada. This tour took place in support of Prince's 19th studio album, "Emancipation" released in November 1996.

This is one of Prince's most notable tours by Prince and also is noted as Prince's first tour in North America after he changed his name in 1993.

Background
After wrapping up his performances at the Blaisdell Arena on his Gold Tour to promote his 17th studio album, The Gold Experience, Prince was due to embark on a North American Leg of the tour in March 1996 with The Time, D'Angelo and Tony Rich. However, due to the fact that Prince was working on Emancipation and quickly putting out projects to hurry and get out of his 1992 Warner Bros. deal, he cancelled the tour. He fired the everyone from the New Power Generation at the time and made a completely new configuration of the band. In July 1996, Prince released his 18th studio album, Chaos and Disorder which marked to be his final album to complete the requirements under his Warner Bros. contract.

In November 1996, Prince released his 19th studio album Emancipation and announced that he was going on a world tour. He said due to the fact that the Warner Bros. contract doesn't end until December 31, 1999,  the tour would continue until the year 2000 so that he wouldn't have to return to the studio. He quickly broke that promise with the release of the de facto Prince album, Newpower Soul by the New Power Generation leading him to change the title of the tour in February 1998.

The world tour was planned to start overseas in Sweden in June 1997 however, all those concerts were cancelled due to reasons unknown. Prince was also supposed to start promo for Emancipation with one-off concerts all across the world planning to come to Brazil, Italy, Germany, England, Spain, France & Netherlands but all further plans were cancelled. Rumors that Prince also planned to headline the 1997 Super Bowl XXXI Halftime Show at the Louisiana Superdome however none of those plans fell through either.

However, in December 1996, Prince announced that he was going to do public warm-up shows for his band in support of his charity, Love 4 One Another. It was named the Love 4 One Another Charities Tour and it started on January 7, 1997, in Upper Darby, Pennsylvania at the Tower Theater. Tickets went on sale just three days before the first show and sold out almost immediately. All of the proceeds made from the tour went to his charity. In July 1997, almost 2 weeks before the first show of the Jam of the Year World Tour began,  tickets were put on sale on July 10 for the first round of shows for the official tour. The first date of the tour started on July 21 in Clarkston, Michigan at the Pine Knob Music Center.

Setlist
{{hidden
| headercss = background: #FFE6FF; font-size: 100%; width: 90%;
| contentcss = text-align: left; font-size: 100%; width: 90%;
| header = Love 4 One Another Charities
| content = 
This setlist on represents the show on January 7, 1997 in Upper Darby, this does not represent the setlist for the remainder of the tour.
"Jam of the Year"
"Talkin' Loud and Sayin' Nothing" (includes "Rock 'N' Roll is Alive! (And It Lives In Minneapolis)" instrumental coda)
"Purple Rain"
"17 Days"
"Get Yo Groove On" (includes an interpolation of "Six")
"The Most Beautiful Girl in the World"
"Face Down"
"The Cross"
"One of Us"
"Do Me, Baby" (includes snippets of "Adore", "Insatiable", "Scandalous", "How Come U Don't Call Me Anymore?")
"Sexy M.F." / "If I Was Your Girlfriend" (includes "♥ or $" instrumental)
"The Ride"
"How Come U Don't Call Me Anymore?"
"Take Me With U" / "Raspberry Beret"
"Mr. Happy"
Encore
"Sleep Around"
"Johnny"
}}
{{hidden
| headercss = background: #FFE6FF; font-size: 100%; width: 90%;
| contentcss = text-align: left; font-size: 100%; width: 90%;
| header = Jam of the Year
| content = 
This setlist on represents the show on July 23, 1997 in Wantagh, this does not represent the setlist for the remainder of the tour.
"Jam of the Year"
"Talkin' Loud and Sayin' Nothing" (includes "Rock 'N' Roll is Alive! (And It Lives In Minneapolis)" instrumental coda)
"Purple Rain"
"Little Red Corvette"
"Get Yo Groove On" (includes an interpolation of "Six")
"The Most Beautiful Girl in the World"
"Face Down"(includes "777-9311" instrumental)
"The Cross"
"One of Us"
"Do Me, Baby" (includes snippets of "Adore", "Insatiable", "Scandalous", "How Come U Don't Call Me Anymore?")
"Sexy M.F." / "If I Was Your Girlfriend" (includes "♥ or $" instrumental)
"How Come U Don't Call Me Anymore?"
"Take Me With U" / "Raspberry Beret" (includes "Mr. Happy" instrumental coda)
Encore
"Girls & Boys" / "Erotic City"
"Sleep Around"
"Baby I'm A Star" / "1999"
}}

Tour Dates

Cancelled Shows

References 

Prince (musician) concert tours
1997 concert tours
1998 concert tours